Jennifer Ryll McAllister (born 21 February 1973) is an Australian politician. She has been a Senator for New South Wales since 2015 and previously served as the party's national president from 2011 to 2015. She is from the Socialist Left faction of the Labor Party. In August 2018 she was appointed Shadow Assistant Minister for Families and Communities.

Early life and education
McAllister was born in Murwillumbah, on the north coast of New South Wales. She attended the University of Queensland from 1992–1995, majoring in Politics and Government, and the University of Sydney, from which she graduated in 1996 with a Bachelor of Arts with First Class Honours, majoring in Political Economy, Politics and Government.

Professional career
McAllister has worked in both the public and private sectors. Between 2006 and 2010, she served as the Director of Climate Change, Air and Noise Policy within the New South Wales Department of Environment, Climate Change and Water. She subsequently joined AECOM Australia Pty Ltd as Strategic Advisor Water and Climate (2010–2013), progressing to Technical Director – Infrastructure Advisory (2013–2014) and was Managing Director, Water and Urban Development (2014–2015) and a member of AECOM's ANZ executive when she resigned to join the Senate.

Political career
McAllister's first formal involvement with politics came in 1992, when she registered as a member of the Australian Labor Party.  In 2003, she co-founded the Labor Environment Activist Network with Kristina Keneally.

McAllister is a member of the ALP State Conference (NSW) (1999–present) and the ALP Administrative Committee (NSW) (2000–present). She was previously a member or delegate of the ALP National Policy Committee on Foreign Affairs (1998–2000), the ALP National Policy Committee (2006–2007). She was also the Labor candidate for the seat of Richmond in the 2001 federal election.

On 25 November 2011, McAllister was elected as National President of the ALP, serving until the conclusion of her term at the 2015 Australian Labor Party National Conference, where she was replaced by Mark Butler.

In July 2014, Jenny McAllister was selected to run on the Labor senate ticket at the 2016 election in the number two position, replacing John Faulkner, and considered a winnable spot. However, on 6 February 2015, John Faulkner resigned from the Senate, creating a casual vacancy. On 6 May 2015, McAllister was elected by a joint sitting of the NSW Parliament to fill the vacancy.

Personal life
McAllister lives in Redfern with her husband, John Graham—former assistant general secretary of the NSW branch of the Labor Party and member of the Legislative Council—and their two children.

References

External links

1973 births
Living people
Politicians from Sydney
People from the Northern Rivers
University of Queensland alumni
University of Sydney alumni
Members of the Australian Senate
Members of the Australian Senate for New South Wales
Women members of the Australian Senate
Australian Labor Party members of the Parliament of Australia
Labor Left politicians
21st-century Australian politicians
21st-century Australian women politicians